Vandenbussche is a surname. Notable people with the surname include:

 Bram Vandenbussche (born 1981), Belgian footballer
 Brian Vandenbussche (born 1981), Belgian footballer
 Hanna Vandenbussche (born 1987), Belgian athlete
 Ryan VandenBussche (born 1973), Canadian ice hockey player